is the 27th single by Japanese pop duo Puffy AmiYumi, released on February 25, 2009. The song is used as the opening theme for the Fuji anime television series Genji Monogatari Sennenki Genji.

A limited edition of the single was released along with the regular edition. The limited edition features an extra live DVD showing footage of 4 songs from Puffy's 2007 honeysweeper tour at Shibuya-AX.

The song was written for Puffy by rock musician Ringo Sheena. Sheena self-covered the song in 2014 on her album Gyakuyunyū: Kōwankyoku.

Track listing

CD
Hiyori Hime
Doki Doki
My Story [variation by argaph]

DVD
Kuchibiru Motion
Hataraku Otoko
Jet Keisatsu
True Asia

References

2009 singles
Puffy AmiYumi songs
Songs written by Ringo Sheena
2009 songs
Ki/oon Music singles